The 1919 Toledo Blue and Gold football team was an American football team that represented Toledo University (renamed the University of Toledo in 1967) as an independent during the 1919 college football season. Led by first-year coach Watt Hobt, Toledo compiled a 2–4 record.

Schedule

References

Toledo
Toledo Rockets football seasons
Toledo Blue and Gold football